Progreso is a city and seat of the municipality of Progreso, in the north-eastern Mexican state of Coahuila.

References

Populated places in Coahuila